Agromyces soli is a Gram-negative and non-motile bacterium from the genus of Agromyces which has been isolated from farm soil from Korea.

References 

Microbacteriaceae
Bacteria described in 2011